The Cox Classic presented by Lexus of Omaha was a professional golf tournament in the central United States on the Web.com Tour. It was played annually for eighteen years at Champions Run in Omaha, Nebraska.

It debuted as the "Nike Omaha Classic" in 1996, with a purse of $200,000 and a winner's share of $36,000, won by Rocky Walcher on August 11. For its 18th and final edition in 2013, the purse had quadrupled to $800,000 and Bronson La'Cassie took the winner's share of $144,000 after three playoff holes.

The Web.com Tour returned to Omaha in 2017 with the Pinnacle Bank Championship, held at public Indian Creek Golf Course in July.

Winners

Bolded golfers graduated to the PGA Tour via the Web.com Tour regular-season money list. Golfers in bold italics were promoted immediately due to it being their third win of the season.

References

External links

Coverage on Web.com Tour's official site
Champions Run

Former Korn Ferry Tour events
Golf in Nebraska
Sports in Omaha, Nebraska
Recurring sporting events established in 1996
Recurring sporting events disestablished in 2013
1996 establishments in Nebraska
2013 disestablishments in Nebraska